Vallinam is a 2014 Indian Tamil-language sports film written and directed by Arivazhagan and produced by Aascar Ravichandran. The film stars Nakul and newcomer Mrudhula Basker. It was released on 28 February 2014.

Plot 
The film starts with Krishna (Nakul) and Shiva (Krishna). They are childhood friends studying in the same college and prominent basketball players preparing for a national-level basketball tournament. Following the events of the college, Shiva dies due to heart attack because he was hit by a basketball shot by Krishna. This makes Krishna end his college career. He then joins a new college where a basketball game is teased by a cricket team there. The story lines up when Krishna takes on basketball again and wins the national-level tournament.

Cast 

 Nakul as Krishna
 Mrudhula Basker as Meera
 Atul Kulkarni as Coach
 Siddharth Jonnalagadda as Vamsi
 Anaswara Kumar as Anu
 Amzath Khan as Guna
 Jagan as Jagan
 Jayaprakash as Krishnamurthy
 Santhana Bharathi as Puzhaldasan
 Saravana Prakash as Balaji
 Y. Gee. Mahendra as Venkatachalam
 Anupama Kumar
 Chandru
 Mathivanan Rajendran
 Mippu as Train passenger
 Sampath Ram
 Kreshna as Shiva (Cameo)
 Aadhi as Basketball coach (Cameo)
 RJ Balaji as Show host (Cameo)

Production 
The film was earlier titled as Acham Thavir and planned with Arulnithi in the lead role, who later opted out. This film revolves around a basketball player and Nakul underwent special training to "ensure that he lived the role rather than act".

Telugu actress Bindu Madhavi was initially signed to portray the lead female character. However, reports in November 2011 confirmed that she was dropped from the project since the director and the crew were not impressed with her performance. She was subsequently replaced film by a newcomer Mrudhula, while other reports during production claimed that Nakul had been replaced by Jai, although this proved untrue. Latest addition Marathi actor Atul Kulkarni is playing a crucial role in this film. Siddharth Jonnalagadda who acted in the Telugu film Love Before Wedding was selected to play another villain.

During production, the makers of the film ran into crowd trouble with students attempting to get autographs from Nakul when he was preparing for the shoot, they were subsequently prevented in doing so from the crew of the film prompting a student protest. The team worked for 72 hours without break for a particular scene which was shot near the Chengalpet railway station.

Soundtrack 
The soundtrack was composed by S. Thaman collaborating with Arivazhagan for second time. Kamal Haasan was said to be approached to sing a song in the film which proved false.

Release 
Although completed way before in early 2013, the film's theatrical release was delayed due to unknown reasons. It finally released on 28 February 2014. Baradwaj Rangan wrote in The Hindu, "Arivazhagan isn’t a lazy filmmaker, and at a time when most Tamil films have begun to look like flatly lit television serials, without the slightest interest in framing and staging, this quality cannot be underestimated".

Awards 
National Award for Best Editor

References

External links 
 

2010s sports films
2010s Tamil-language films
2014 films
Basketball films
Films directed by Arivazhagan Venkatachalam
Films scored by Thaman S
Films whose editor won the Best Film Editing National Award
Indian sports films